The 2020 Missouri Attorney General election was held on November 3, 2020, to elect the Attorney General of Missouri. It was held concurrently with the presidential election, along with elections to the United States Senate and United States House of Representatives, as well as various state and local elections. Incumbent Republican Attorney General Eric Schmitt was elected to a full term after he was appointed by Governor Mike Parson when Josh Hawley was elected to the U.S. Senate in 2018.

Republican primary

Candidates

Declared
 Eric Schmitt, incumbent Missouri Attorney General

Results

Democratic primary

Candidates

Declared
Richard Finneran, former federal prosecutor
Elad Gross, civil rights attorney and former Assistant Attorney General

Endorsements

Results

Libertarian primary

Candidates

Declared
Kevin Babcock

Results

General election

Predictions

Polling

with Elad Gross

Results

See also
2020 Missouri gubernatorial election

Notes

References

Attorney General
Missouri
Missouri Attorney General elections